John Felagha (27 July 199431 August 2020) was a Nigerian footballer who played as a goalkeeper. He died on 31 August 2020 in Senegal.

Career statistics

Club

Notes

References

1994 births
2020 deaths
Sportspeople from Lagos
Nigerian footballers
Nigeria under-20 international footballers
Nigerian expatriate footballers
Association football goalkeepers
Aspire Academy (Senegal) players
K.A.S. Eupen players
Challenger Pro League players
Nigerian expatriate sportspeople in Qatar
Expatriate footballers in Qatar
Nigerian expatriate sportspeople in Belgium
Expatriate footballers in Belgium
AIDS-related deaths in Senegal
21st-century Nigerian people